The Diocese of Superior is a Latin Church ecclesiastical territory or diocese of the Catholic Church that encompasses the city of Superior and the counties of Ashland, Barron, Bayfield, Burnett, Douglas, Iron, Lincoln, Oneida, Price, Polk, Rusk, Sawyer, St. Croix, Taylor, Vilas, and Washburn in northern Wisconsin, with an area of . Its episcopal see is Superior, and the Cathedral of Christ the King in Superior is its mother church. It is a suffragan diocese of the metropolitan Archdiocese of Milwaukee.

History

The diocese was established on May 3, 1905 by Pope Pius X. It was created from the northern part of the Diocese of La Crosse and the northwestern part of the Diocese of Green Bay, with Augustine Francis Schinner as the first bishop.

Prior to the official founding of the diocese in 1905, there had already been a rich history of Catholicism in the region. Centuries earlier, Catholic missionaries had forged a dynamic presence throughout the Lake Superior region of Wisconsin.

The early history of Catholicism in the state of Wisconsin started within the territory that the Diocese of Superior now encompasses, with the arrival of Father René Menard in 1661. Fr. Menard was a Jesuit missionary who came to North America to evangelize the Native American population, and was fluent in the Ojibwe, Odawa, and Huron dialects. After spending the winter of 1660–1661 in the Upper Peninsula of Michigan, some historical accounts have Fr. Menard venturing in the spring of 1661 to Chequamegon Bay, near Ashland. Although his time there was short, he cleared the path for fellow Jesuits who followed him.

In 1665, Fr. Claude Allouez started a Catholic mission near Chequamegon Bay, and named it the Mission of the Holy Ghost. The exact location of the mission remains a mystery, although historians have speculated it was located at La Pointe, on Madeline Island. Historically, Madeline Island was a spiritual center for the Lake Superior Chippewa.

In 1669, Fr. Jacques Marquette arrived at the Mission of the Holy Ghost, upon the departure of Fr. Allouez to the Fox River Valley. Fr. Marquette found success in his work among the native people, and baptized over 1,000 converts.

During this time, the region was being overseen by French Catholic leaders in Quebec, which became a diocese in 1674, encompassing all of North America east of the Mississippi River. In 1791, the region was transferred to the Diocese of Baltimore, which was the first Catholic diocese created in the then-newly formed United States.

In 1843, the Diocese of Milwaukee was established, and consisted of the entire state of Wisconsin. Northern Wisconsin remained within the Diocese of Milwaukee, until the formation of the Diocese of Lacrosse, and the Diocese of Green Bay, which then served the northern region. Finally, in 1905, the Diocese of Superior was created by Pope Pius X, encompassing 16 counties in northern Wisconsin.

The oldest Catholic congregation in the state of Wisconsin (in continuous operation to the present-day) is within the Diocese of Superior. On July 27, 1836, Fr. Frederic Baraga arrived at La Pointe, and immediately set to work, building a log church. Fr. Baraga, like the Jesuit missionaries before him, had success evangelizing the native people. His congregation at La Pointe grew, and also included many early European immigrants, primarily French Fur Traders. In 1838, Fr. Baraga built a larger church at La Pointe, on the spot of the present-day location of St. Joseph's Catholic Church.

The first Bishop to serve the Diocese of Superior was Augustine Francis Schinner, who was consecrated as Bishop on July 25, 1905. Bishop Schinner faced many challenges, as the head of the new diocese, including the need to recruit priests to serve the growing number of parishes throughout the diocese. By the time Bishop Schinner resigned as the bishop of Superior in 1913, he saw the pool of priests grow from 39 diocesan priests in 1905 to 62 in 1913.

Today, there are now 105 parishes within the Diocese of Superior.

Reports of sex abuse
Lawrence Murphy, a priest from the Archdiocese of Milwaukee, was transferred to the Diocese of Superior in 1974 after sex abuse allegations surfaced against him in the archdiocese. It was reported that Murphy, who died in 1998, continued sexually abusing children while serving in the Diocese of Superior as well.

In February 2002, priest Ryan Erickson shot and killed two men at a funeral home in Hudson, WI. One of his victims, Daniel O'Connell, had earlier confronted him over allegations that Erickson had molested several local children. In 2004, Erickson hanged himself after coming under suspicion for the double homicide.

In January 2019, The Diocese of Superior agreed to cooperate with authorities following the arrest of Diocese priest Tom Ericksen (no relation) on charges of sexually abusing children in the 1980s. These allegations against Ericksen, who was arrested in Minneapolis, Minnesota in November 2018, had also surfaced in 2010 as well.

Bishops

Bishops of Superior
 Augustine Francis Schinner (1905–1913)
 Joseph Maria Koudelka (1913–1921)
 Joseph G. Pinten (1922–1926)
 Theodore H. Reverman (1926–1941)
 William Patrick O'Connor (1942–1946), appointed Bishop of Madison
 Albert Gregory Meyer (1946–1953), appointed Archbishop of Milwaukee and Archbishop of Chicago (elevated to Cardinal in 1959)
 Joseph John Annabring (1954–1959)
 George Albert Hammes (1960–1985)
 Raphael Michael Fliss (1985–2007)
 Peter F. Christensen (2007–2014), appointed Bishop of Boise
 James Patrick Powers (2016–present)

Media
 The Diocese of Superior publishes a bi-weekly newspaper, The Superior Catholic Herald, which was founded in 1953. There are approximately 12,000 subscribers and an estimated readership of more than 36,000.
 Real Presence Radio (WWEN), broadcasts from Wentworth, Wisconsin, and serves the Duluth-Superior area. Real Presence Radio is a Catholic talk radio network based in Grand Forks, North Dakota. The network also carries some programming from the national EWTN Radio network.
 Holy Family Radio (WWMD-LP), a 100-watt station, broadcasts from Ashland on 95.5 FM. The station is an affiliate of Relevant Radio, a Catholic Radio network based in Green Bay. Holy Family Educational Association, Inc. manages the station, which has been on the air since 2007 and reaches the Ashland and Washburn area.

Demographics
The Diocese of Superior has a membership of 73,638 Catholics in 105 parishes. Eight of those parishes stand as single parish units, and 96 parishes have been combined to form 34 clusters. There are 46 priests and 65 permanent deacons.

Within the diocese, there are 15 elementary schools, but no high schools or seminaries. There are 74 Catholic cemeteries.

Catholic schools
The Diocese of Superior operates 14 elementary schools, with a combined total of over 2,000 students. Catholic schools operate in the following communities:

 Ashland – Our Lady of the Lake School 	
 Hudson – St. Patrick School
 Ladysmith – Our Lady of Sorrows School 	
 Medford – Holy Rosary School
 Merrill – St. Francis Xavier School 	
 New Richmond – St. Mary School
 Reserve – St. Francis Solanus School
 Rhinelander – Nativity of Our Lord School 	
 Rice Lake – St. Joseph School
 River Falls – St. Bridget School 	
 Somerset – St. Anne School
 Spooner – St. Francis de Sales School 	
 Superior – Cathedral School
 Tomahawk – St. Mary School

See also

 List of the Catholic dioceses of the United States
 List of Roman Catholic dioceses (alphabetical)
 List of Roman Catholic dioceses (structured view)

References

External links

Roman Catholic Diocese of Superior Official Site
History of the Catholic Diocese of Superior, Wisconsin
Christ the King Cathedral
Superior Catholic Herald newspaper

Arms

 
Superior
1905 establishments in Wisconsin
Christian organizations established in 1905
Superior
Douglas County, Wisconsin